Erik Isaac Morales Elvira (born September 1, 1976) is a Mexican former professional boxer who competed from 1993 to 2012. He is the first Mexico-born boxer in history to win world championships in four weight classes, ranging from super bantamweight to light welterweight.

Morales defeated fifteen world champions during the course of his career, and is famous for his trilogies with fellow Mexican legend Marco Antonio Barrera, as well as Manny Pacquiao. ESPN ranked Morales at number 49 on their list of the 50 greatest boxers of all time.

Morales was inducted into the International Boxing Hall of Fame in June 2018.

Career history

Early career
Erik Morales was born in the Zona Norte section of Tijuana. Under the tutelage of his father, José Morales, a fighter himself, Erik started boxing at the age of five and amassed a very impressive amateur career that totaled 114 fights (108–6), winning 11 major titles in Mexico in the process. Morales made his professional debut at the age of 16 by knocking out Jose Orejel in two rounds. Between 1993 and 1997, he quickly climbed the ranks in the super bantamweight division, winning 26 fights, 20 by knockout, including wins against former champions Kenny Mitchell and Hector Acero Sánchez, before challenging for his first world title. It was during this time that he signed with promoter Bob Arum.

Super bantamweight

Morales vs. Zaragoza
On September 6, 1997, in El Paso, Texas, at the age of 21, he won his first world title by stopping WBC Super Bantamweight Champion and now member of the International Boxing Hall of Fame, Daniel Zaragoza, via knockout in eleven rounds.

In his first defense, Morales defeated John Lowey (24–2) by knockout in the seventh round. In his next fight, he defeated Remigio Molina (31–1) by knockout in the 6th orund. On May 16, 1998, he defeated former champion Jose Luis Bueno via knockout in the second round.

Morales vs. Jones
In September 1998, in another landmark fight, Morales knocked out former two-weight world champion Junior Jones of the United States. Jones went into the battle with a daunting record against Mexican fighters of 35 victories and no losses, most notably including two victories over the previous champion, Marco Antonio Barrera, in 1996 and 1997. Also noteworthy was that Jones was entering México for the first time to fight, and the fight was held at Tijuana. The fight went on to three contested rounds, before Morales knocked out Jones with two consecutive overhead right crosses in the fourth round.

In October 1999, Morales fought and defeated former WBC Bantamweight Champion Wayne McCullough of Northern Ireland, saying that McCullough gave him one of the three toughest fights of his career.

Morales vs. Barrera I

In February 2000, Morales defeated Marco Antonio Barrera to win the WBO Super Bantamweight title, in a fight that is now considered one of boxing's classics. Morales won the fight by a controversial split decision. It was an intense battle in which both fighters were cut and battered. Many people thought Barrera had won the fight on a knockdown that he scored in the twelfth and final round. After the fight, Morales said, "He was a brave fighter, and we both gave it all we had. We were both hurt during the fight. He was the biggest puncher I ever faced in the ring." The Ring named it the Fight of the Year.

Featherweight
After nine successful title defenses, Morales chose to vacate his WBC Super Bantamweight title to move up to featherweight division. In his second fight at this weight, he fought 33-year-old former world champion Kevin Kelley, in September 2000. Kelley was knocked down in the fifth and seventh rounds, he was finally trapped in the latter round by a flurry of five consecutive uppercuts from Morales. Supported only by the ropes, a sixth uppercut landed, and the fight was stopped. Morales became the Interim WBC Featherweight Champion.

Morales vs. Espadas Jr.
Morales fought again in 2000, knocking out Rodney Jones in the first round. In February 2001, he fought Guty Espadas Jr., the WBC Featherweight title holder with a thirteen fight winning streak, and whose father, Guty Espadas, Sr., was also a world champion boxer. Morales won a close twelve-round decision to claim his third world title in his second weight division. Although Morales was highly rated in the featherweight division, Naseem Hamed was seen as the Lineal Champion of the division.

In July 2001, Morales defeated future champion In Jin Chi of South Korea and retained his title. Chi gave a strong effort, but Morales was the sharper, harder puncher and outworked him for much of the fight. Morales was cut and swollen over the left eye in the sixth round by an accidental clash of heads and Chi was penalized one point in the tenth round.

Morales vs. Barrera II
Morales then tasted defeat for the first time in his 42nd professional fight when he lost (this time) a controversial majority decision and his WBC title against Lineal Champion, Marco Antonio Barrera in June 2002, in a re-match of their February 2000 fight. Morales constantly pressed forward and dominated much of the first half of the fight (clearly winning at least 4 of the first 6 rounds). He was cut on the bridge of the nose in the 2nd round, and cut and swollen over his right eye in the 8th. However, he punched Barrera to the canvas during the middle rounds but this was called a slip. Barrera fought cautiously in the early rounds, but rallied as the fight progressed, although Morales seemed to narrowly win rounds 10 and 11, which when including his dominance in the first half of the fight, seemed to seal him the close victory on the score-cards. HBO's unofficial ring-side scorer: Harold Lederman, scored the fight 115–113 (7 rounds to 5) for Morales.

Morales bounced back with a dominating twelve-round decision victory over former world champion, Paulie Ayala in November 2002 to regain the vacant WBC Featherweight title. The early rounds were close, but Morales started to dominate in the middle rounds, consistently landing the harder punches and Ayala's left eye began to swell. He slowed his pace in the late rounds and Ayala rallied, but Morales rocked him with a series of punches in the 12th round.

Morales defeated Eddie Croft in March 2003. He scored three knockdowns and stopped Croft in the 3rd round. All the fighters on the card donated their purses to "Vamos Mexico," a children's charity headed by Marta Sahagun, wife of Mexican president Vicente Fox.

Morales defeated Fernando Velardez later that year. He knocked down Velardez in the 1st, 4th and 5th rounds when the fight was stopped without a count. In October 2003, Morales defeated Guty Espadas Jr. in a rematch of their first close fight. This time Morales knocked him out in three rounds.

Super featherweight

Morales vs. Chávez
Morales vacated his WBC Featherweight title and moved up to the super featherweight division. On February 28, 2004, Morales captured the WBC Super Featherweight title by unanimous decision over Jesús Chávez. Morales twice knocked down Chávez, which Floyd Mayweather Jr. had been unable to do. Morales was rocked midway through the 1st round, but he came back to score two knockdowns in the 2nd round and managed to cut Chavez over the left eye. Chavez injured his right shoulder early in the fight and threw very few right hands, but still fought aggressively for the rest of the fight with his jab and left hooks which cut Morales over the eye in the 4th round. With the victory he became the second Mexican boxer to win a title at three separate weight divisions, the first being the acclaimed Julio César Chávez.

On July 31, 2004, Morales unified his WBC Super Featherweight title with the IBF version by way of a twelve-round unanimous decision over Carlos Hernández. Hernández constantly pressed forward, but Morales boxed effectively consistently landing the harder, more accurate punches that rocked Hernández several times.

Morales vs. Barrera III
On November 27, 2004, Morales fought Barrera for the third time in a bout for the WBC Super Featherweight title. Their highly anticipated third battle drew a capacity crowd of over 11,000. Barrera started fast and rocked Morales late in the first round and bloodied his nose in the second. Morales came back strongly in the second half of the fight and won four of the last six rounds on two judges' scorecards. However, the judges scored the bout 114–114, 114–115, 113–115 in favor of Barrera, in what was justifiably a very, very close, but non-controversial and justifiable win for Barrera. Their third meeting was once again named The Ring Fight of the Year.

Morales vs. Pacquiao I
On March 19, 2005, as a betting underdog, Morales defeated then three-division world champion Filipino boxer Manny Pacquiao, by a unanimous decision.  During the 12th round, Morales, comfortably ahead on the scorecards, decided to brawl with the Filipino slugger, even turning southpaw during the process. In a post fight interview, HBO broadcaster Larry Merchant, asked Morales, "Why?"  Morales replied by asking a question of his own, "Did you enjoy it?  That's why."

Later that night, at the post-fight press conference, Erik further explained his reasoning for brawling with the Filipino slugger; "It was a great pleasure to fight this way. I think I was controlling the fight with my distance. Sometimes I need to put a little flavor into the ring. My promoter always says that I make the fights very difficult, but they're not difficult, they're fun for the public. I decided to stop myself in front of him in the twelfth round because I wanted to give the public what they deserve. It was a great round. I'm very happy about it."

Lightweight

Morales vs. Raheem
On September 10, 2005, Erik Morales moved up to the lightweight division and was defeated by unanimous decision by Zahir Raheem. Raheem frustrated Morales with constant lateral movement. Raheem rocked Morales in the 5th round and built a lead on the scorecards, but Morales rallied in the 11th round and staggered him with a right hand as Raheem's glove touched the canvas, but it was not scored a knockdown by referee Jon Schorle. The final scores were 118–110, 116–112 and 115–112 in favor of Raheem.

Return to Super featherweight

Morales vs. Pacquiao II & III
On January 22, 2006, Morales fought Pacquiao in a rematch from their bout ten months before and was defeated in ten rounds. Pacquiao knocked down Morales twice in the final seconds of round ten and the fight was stopped.

He fought Pacquiao for the third time in a non-championship title bout, on November 18, 2006. Morales was defeated by a knockout in three rounds. After the fight, Morales said "Maybe it's time I should no longer be doing this." He sat speechless in his corner for five minutes afterward. "I did everything in camp necessary to win this fight. I didn't win it. It wasn't my night...it just wasn't meant to be." Asked by Larry Merchant whether he would retire from boxing, Morales offered, "Maybe this is the way to end it. It's a beautiful night, and there's a lot of good people (here in the audience)...it was always a pleasure to give the public great fights."

Return to Lightweight
Morales moved up to the lightweight division in search of a possible fourth WBC title. During a holiday visit to the Philippines in January 2007, Morales told a local newspaper that he was fighting again but declined to name his next opponent. He stated that he had unfinished business in the boxing ring and was determined to regain recognition as a world champion.

Morales vs. Díaz
On August 4, 2007, Morales fought David Díaz for the WBC Lightweight title and lost a close unanimous decision at the Allstate Arena. Judges Herminio, Cuevas Collazo and Robert Hecko both scored Round 1, 10–9 Morales, even though Morales knocked down Díaz in that round. Collazo then went on to score Round 2, 10–8 for Diaz, when not only did a knockdown not occur, but the two other judges saw it as a Morales round. The final scores read 114–113 (Collazo), 115–113 (Hecko) and 115–112 (Uratani), all in favor of Díaz. It was Morales' fifth loss in his last six bouts. During the post-fight press conference, Morales announced his retirement from boxing.

Comeback

In various interviews conducted in 2009, Morales began to state that he would fight again in late 2009 to early 2010, after he gave his body enough time to rest. Morales also stated that he would continue to fight as a lightweight.

His first comeback fight was then set for México in early 2010, against ranked Nicaraguan welterweight contender José Alfaro.

Light welterweight

Morales vs. Maidana

On April 9, 2011, the MGM Grand Garden Arena hosted HBO Pay Per View's "Action Heroes." The main event featured Erik Morales fighting against Marcos Rene Maidana.

Many boxing pundits felt that an aging Morales, fighting a couple of divisions above his best weight, stood little chance against the hard hitting Maidana. However, Morales turned back the clock and gave his best performance since beating Pacquiao. The opening bell saw Maidana jump on the older Morales. Morales' eye was badly swollen in the first round by a series of hard shots, especially a devastating uppercut, and it looked like the rout was on. However, Morales held his own through the next few rounds before rallying in the 8th–10th rounds. Although Maidana was using combos to hurt "El Terrible," Morales started turning the tide mid-fight, throwing very heavy counter-punches and almost knocking Maidana down. However, just when the fight seemed within Morales' grasp, Maidana took over by throwing combos, giving him the final rounds of the fight. Morales put up a valiant effort, performed better than anyone thought possible, won the crowd over and gave the boxing public another "Fight of the Year" candidate. However, it just wasn't enough. In the end, Maidana's youth and Morales' age and mileage were just too much to overcome, and Maidana eked out a majority decision victory with scores of 114–114 and 116–112 twice.

Morales vs. Cano
Morales was due to fight WBO Inter-Continental Light Welterweight Champion Lucas Matthysse as an undercard to the Floyd Mayweather Jr. vs. Victor Ortiz bout. Matthysse pulled out of the bout, citing a viral infection.

On September 17, 2011, Morales won the WBC Light Welterweight Championship with a win over un-rated Pablo César Cano. The title had been vacant after previous champion Timothy Bradley's status had contentiously been changed to Champ in Recess due to inactivity. Many including experts and commentators saw the title won by Morales as a paper championship. Following Morales' win, he would be rated No.7 on Ring Magazine's light welterweight ratings, with all other title holders and highly rated contenders ranked above him. Morales is the inaugural Mexico-born boxer to win world titles in four different weight classes.

Morales vs. Garcia I & II

On March 24, 2012, Morales faced 23-year-old Danny García (22–0 14 KO's) in another chapter of the storied "Puerto Rico vs. Mexico" boxing rivalry. García entered the contest following victories over former titleholders Nate Campbell and Kendall Holt. However, Morales attended the weigh-in over two pounds above the light welterweight limit. He remained champion until the fight, but only García could win the belt by defeating him, as a Morales win would vacate it. Morales lost by unanimous decision.

Morales fought on October 20, 2012, on a rematch with now The Ring, WBC & WBA (Super) Light Welterweight Champion Danny Garcia. He was knocked out by Danny Garcia in the 4th round, the fight was aired on Showtime Boxing. Here is how FOX Sports described how Danny Garcia knocked out Erik Morales:

"Morales is dancing in the opening seconds but is that because he's got a second wind or because he still doesn't know where he is. He did head to the wrong corner at the end of the last round.

This is a bad omen folks. Garcia is tapping Morales' guard with his left hand, literally telling Morales where the next shot is going to come. After four taps, Morales decides it's time to get aggressive. Bad move. Garcia blasts Morales with a left hook that launches Morales through the ropes. You can see it in Morales' eyes, he's not getting back up. KO for Garcia."

Doping allegations
Prior to Morales-Garcia rematch on October 20, 2012, United States Anti-Doping Agency (USADA) conducted two random drug tests (Oct 3 and 10, 2012). Morales was tested positive for use of the banned substance Clenbuterol, a weight-loss drug, it reduces fat deposits and is believed to increase muscle mass. Although the New York State Athletic Commission was notified 24 hours in advance of the Garcia-Morales bout regarding Morales’ positive drug test results, the legal process was still ongoing. The NYSAC allowed the fight to proceed.

Retirement
In March 2013, Morales revealed plans to fight at least once more. “The idea is to make a nice party for the farewell of my career,” he said. “I’ve had a 20-year career. “(The party is) not only for me, but for the people who stood by me – my father, my mother, my brothers, the fans, the press, especially the coaches, trainers, doctors, sparring partners and all of those who helped prepare me and demanded me to be better every day. But mostly, my children and my wife, who often had to endure my absence for long periods of time. This is not just for me, but for everyone involved in my career,” Morales said. In June 2014, Morales officially announced his retirement forgoing a farewell fight.

Outside the ring
Morales was trained and managed by his father José Morales and was promoted by Bob Arum and Top Rank. His brothers are Iván Morales and former WBO Super Flyweight Champion Diego Morales. Erik has four children.

Erik Morales currently spends his time managing a $3.5 million budget running the parks and recreation department in Tijuana. Morales donates his salary back to the department to further help fund it. Morales was quoted as saying, "This is just a way for me to be able to thank the people who have been so good to me all my life."

On May 30, 2015, Morales agreed to train former light welterweight champion Jessie Vargas for his then-upcoming fight with Timothy Bradley. Morales replaced world champion Roy Jones Jr. as the head trainer Vargas's corner.

It was announced on December 1, 2021, that one of Morales' sons, 23 year old Fernando, had died. Fernando's cause of death was not immediately known.

Political career
In July 2018, Morales won a seat at the Chamber of Deputies (Mexican Congress) for Baja California. He currently serves in the legislative body's committee on sports.

Professional boxing record

Exhibition boxing record

Pay-per-view bouts

See also
List of Mexican boxing world champions
Notable boxing families
List of super bantamweight boxing champions
List of featherweight boxing champions
List of super featherweight boxing champions
List of light welterweight boxing champions
List of IBF world champions
List of WBO world champions
List of boxing quadruple champions

References

External links

1976 births
International Boxing Federation champions
Lightweight boxers
Living people
Mexican male boxers
Boxers from Baja California
Sportspeople from Tijuana
World Boxing Council champions
World featherweight boxing champions
World super-bantamweight boxing champions
World super-featherweight boxing champions
World boxing champions
Doping cases in boxing
World light-welterweight boxing champions
Deputies of the LXIV Legislature of Mexico
Members of the Chamber of Deputies (Mexico) for Baja California
International Boxing Hall of Fame inductees